Reuben Denton Nevius (1827 – 14 December 1913) was an American botanist and Episcopal priest, missionary, and the first registrar of the Diocese of Olympia, Washington.

Born in Ovid, New York, the Rev. Reuben Denton Nevius received in 1849 his D.D. from Union College in Schenectady, New York. In 1850, Nevius went to Columbus, Georgia for further religious study. After ordination, he served as an Episcopal priest in Wetumpka, Alabama.

 
In 1872, Nevius was given the ecclesiastical responsibility for a wide circuit in eastern Oregon, where he established seven new congregations. His circuit-riding responsibilities later included eastern Washington and Idaho. He directed the building of many new churches, some of which are still standing.

Asa Gray named the plant genus Neviusia in his honor. There has been a controversy over assigning credit for the discovery of this genus.

Bibliography
Albert Allen, Mission Accomplished: The Life of Reuben Denton Nevius, D.D. (New York: Vantage Press, 1998).
David Powers and Gregory Nelson, A Gentleman of the Old School: Reuben Denton Nevius, 1827-1913, Botanist, Builder, Teacher, Churchman (Keizer, Oregon: Gregory L. Nelson, 2001).

See also
St. John's Episcopal Church (Olympia, Washington)

References

External links
St. Mary's By-The-Sea Episcopal Church: The Rev. Dr. Reuben Denton Nevius (1827–1913), blog post 29 January 2009

1827 births
1913 deaths
American Episcopal clergy
American botanists
Union College (New York) alumni
Scientists from New York (state)
19th-century American Episcopalians